A tenants union is a group of tenants that educate others about their rights and responsibilities as renters.

Process 
Usually the process starts with a group of tenants creating a written list of demands. One tenant with legitimate complaints about building safety, high rent, maintenance issues, landlord harassment, and other harmful practices is easy to ignore. An organized group of tenants with a list of specific demands is more likely to get a landlord negotiating. No "official" recognition is required in order for a tenant union to be legitimate and impactful. United States of America federal law prohibits housing discrimination based on race, gender, religion and other protected identity categories, but it doesn't explicitly protect tenants' right to organize collectively.

The goal of a tenants union is to empower people to fight for housing as a human right or reforms like rent control. In the United States, tenant unions in the state of New York have pushed for the passage of Good Cause Eviction laws following the end of COVID-19 eviction moratoriums. Good cause could include non payment, lease violations, nuisance cases, or if a landlord wants to move into the property.

See also
Arizona Tenants Advocates – tenants union in Tempe, Arizona
International Union of Tenants
Living Rent – tenants union in Scotland
Renters and Housing Union – tenants union in Australia
Affordable housing
Eviction
Rent strike

References 

Landlord–tenant law
Housing rights organizations